Lozinghem is a commune in the Pas-de-Calais department in the Hauts-de-France region of France.

Geography

Population

Places of interest
 A sixteenth century manorhouse.
 A farmhouse dating from the seventeenth century.
 The church of St. Riquier, built in 1866.
 A chapel

See also
Communes of the Pas-de-Calais department

References

Communes of Pas-de-Calais